The Harte Research Institute for Gulf of Mexico Studies (HRI) at Texas A&M University-Corpus Christi is the only marine research institute dedicated solely to advancing the long-term sustainable use and conservation of the world's ninth-largest body of water. Established in 2001, HRI integrates outstanding scientific research with public policy to provide international leadership in generating and disseminating knowledge about the Gulf of Mexico ecosystem and its critical role in the economies of the North American region.

Mission 
HRI's Vision: A Gulf of Mexico that is ecologically and economically sustainable

HRI's Mission: Science driven solutions to Gulf of Mexico problems

History 
On September 19, 2000, the late Edward H. Harte, philanthropist and former owner of the Corpus Christi Caller-Times newspaper, donated $46 million to establish a new research institute to focus on the Gulf of Mexico. 
The previous year, knowing that Harte, a committed conservationist, had been deeply impressed by internationally famed oceanographer Sylvia Earle’s book Sea Change: A Message of the Oceans, Texas A&M University-Corpus Christi President Robert Furgason approached him about establishing an internationally distinguished research organization focused on the exploration and sustainability of the Gulf of Mexico. While acknowledging that there were already a number of excellent marine research institutes across the country, Furgason pointed out that none focused principally on the Gulf of Mexico, despite the fact that it is a vital part of the economies of the Southern United States, Mexico and Cuba.

During the 2001 Texas Legislative Session, Dr. Furgason, with the assistance of State Rep. Robert A. Junell, obtained $15 million from the State of Texas to build a facility for the Harte Research Institute on the Texas A&M-Corpus Christi campus. An additional $3 million was added from other state building funds to allow for the construction of graduate instruction and research laboratories and offices. These labs and offices allow collaboration between Harte research scientists and faculty and students within the University’s College of Science and Engineering. Other Texas A&M University-Corpus Christi entities working cooperatively and collaboratively with HRI include:

 Center for Coastal Studies
 Center for Water Supply Studies
 Conrad Blucher Institute for Surveying and Science
 Geographic Information Science research program
 Texas Coastal Ocean Observation Network

In September 2001, Dr. John W. ("Wes") Tunnell, Jr. was appointed associate director and that fall the new institute was officially named the Harte Research Institute for Gulf of Mexico Studies. Over the next several years the organization and structure of HRI was developed, the research areas were determined, the building was constructed, and the university's first science Ph.D. program was implemented.

Following his retirement as University President, in January 2005 Dr. Furgason became HRI's first executive director. Under his leadership, HRI hired its endowed chairs as well as senior staff in several key programs; appointed 16 research assistants and associates to work in the field and HRI's high-tech laboratories; received license for its scientists and researchers to travel to Cuba; was awarded two grants to work in Cuba; and sponsored its first three underwater expeditions. On Dec. 31, 2007, Dr. Furgason retired a second time and University President Flavius Killebrew named Dr. Larry McKinney, retired director of Coastal Fisheries and senior director of Aquatic Resources for the Texas Parks and Wildlife Department, HRI Executive Director.

The Harte Model 
The Harte Model is organized into seven areas headed by Endowed Chairs who are among the world's leading experts in their areas of research: Coastal and Marine Geospatial Sciences; Ecosystems Studies and Modeling; Biodiversity and Conservation Science; Fisheries and Ocean Health; Marine Policy and Law; and Socio-Economics. The interdisciplinary collaboration between the chairs allows HRI to employ a holistic approach in addressing ecosystem scale problems and helps increase understanding that people and the environment are inexorably linked in their solution, which makes HRI unique in the community of marine science institutes.

International Collaboration 
Because the Gulf of Mexico is a large marine ecosystem where there are no political boundaries to waters and biota, HRI encourages a tri-national responsibility between the United States, Mexico and Cuba in preserving the Gulf's ecosystem; ensuring its economic and ecological sustainability; and promoting the understanding that people and the environment are inexorably linked. In their work, HRI scientists cooperate and collaborate with colleagues from Mexico and Cuba whenever possible. The tri-national alliance includes members from private business (fisheries, tourism, oil and gas, etc.), state and federal agencies, academia, conservation and other non-governmental groups, and private citizens. The HRI is co-founder of the Tri-national Initiative for Marine Science and Conservation that meets each year in one of the three countries. The HRI most recently produced a tri-national booklet called Gulf360, an overview of the natural and social systems in and around the Gulf.

The original HRI logo incorporates the silhouettes of three sails that represent the cooperation between the three countries in addressing the environmental and economic challenges facing the Gulf of Mexico. Inspired by the travels of Spanish explorer Álvar Núñez Cabeza de Vaca whose trail of discovery followed the Gulf Coast, the wind-filled sails symbolize moving into the future. The wave at the bottom represents the Gulf, while the circle symbolizes the rising sun, emphasizing the dawn of a new era in the Gulf and at Texas A&M University-Corpus Christi.

Gulf of Mexico Summits 
The HRI was scheduled to host the first State of the Gulf of Mexico Summit in November 2005. However, the unprecedented event had to be postponed after Hurricane Katrina hit the Gulf Coast on August 29, causing severe destruction and catastrophic loss of life from Central Florida to Louisiana. When it was finally convened from March 28–30, 2006, in Corpus Christi, Texas, the summit brought together world-renowned oceanic scientists with leaders of government, business, industry, conservation and resource management to plan for the long-term sustainability of the Gulf of Mexico. The purpose of the summit was to focus the international spotlight on the Gulf; expand awareness of its socioeconomic and ecological value and its importance to a sustainable desired quality of life; build partnerships for proactive management for the world's ninth largest body of water; and establish a cohesive strategy for ensuring the Gulf of Mexico's ecological and socioeconomic health and productivity.

The second State of the Gulf of Mexico Summit held December 4–8, 2011, in Houston, Texas, highlighted the strong need for a platform to develop a shared vision of a healthy Gulf in the aftermath of the April 2010 Deepwater Horizon oil spill catastrophe. In order to formulate a roadmap for restoring the Gulf, government, NGO and academic experts addressed a broad range of issues including: loss of wetlands, hypoxia, coastal resiliency, ecosystem health, marine protected areas, international cooperation, oil spill recovery, and social and economic recovery.

At the 2011 Summit, the HRI along with partners Harwell Gentile & Associates, LLC and University of Maryland Center for Environmental Science presented a comprehensive "Gulf of Mexico Ecosystem Report Card Prototype" that would provide a scientific, graphical representation of the Gulf's current environmental condition. The Report Card Prototype, which was made available to the highest levels of decision makers, the most knowledgeable and experienced scientific investigators, and the general public, detailed the policies and resources needed to achieve sustainability of a healthy Gulf of Mexico.

At the State of the Gulf of Mexico Summit 2014 held March 24–27 in Houston, Texas, Mexico's National Institute of Statistics and Geography (Instituto Nacional de Estadística y Geografía - INEGI) and Texas A&M-Corpus Christi signed an agreement to cooperate in addressing some of the most complex issues relating to the Gulf. The agreement includes shared research projects, the interchange of findings, and other collaborations on issues ranging from the protection of endangered marine species to offshore drilling and contamination.

The State of the Gulf of Mexico Summit 2017 will be held March 26–28, 2017 in Houston, Texas.

Deepwater Horizon Oil Spill 
The Deepwater Horizon oil spill that released more than 4.9 million barrels of oil into the Gulf of Mexico between April 20, and July 15, 2010, created a unique opportunity to address many of the long-term issues fundamental to the Gulf's future sustainability. HRI scientists have and continue to provide leadership in assessing the long-term impacts of the largest accidental marine oil spill in the history of the petroleum industry and are fostering the Gulf's recovery by helping guide restoration to assure that conservation efforts are effective and long lasting. HRI has already influenced the allocation of billions of dollars toward Gulf restoration and will continue to do so.

Center for Sportfish Science and Conservation 
In fall 2012, The Coastal Conservation Association committed $500,000 for HRI to establish the first research center for the study of sportfish in the western Gulf of Mexico. The Harte Research Support Foundation contributed more than $300,000 to build an offshore research vessel, purchase other supporting equipment such as new vehicles, and other funding. The Center focuses on the many challenges to maintaining healthy populations, both inshore and offshore, to assure the best decisions are made in managing fisheries and the marine environment.

Research Databases 
 The HRI GulfBase website is a searchable and sortable database website for all Gulf of Mexico researchers and research institutes. It includes ever-increasing amounts of information on bays and lagoons, reefs and islands and events to help researchers, policy makers, and the general public work together to insure long-term sustainable use and conservation of the Gulf of Mexico.
 The Gulf of Mexico Research Initiative Information and Data Cooperative (GRIIDC) is implementing a research database to receive and process data collected from multiple sources and scientific disciplines in the Gulf of Mexico. GRIIDC will have web services to allow for direct access or machine-to-machine communication to its repository.
 The HRI Gulf of Mexico Ecosystem Services Valuation Database (GecoServ) is a searchable database that gathers ecosystem services (ES) valuation studies relevant to the Gulf of Mexico. GecoServ's two main goals are to allow for the distribution and sharing of information about such studies and to identify current gaps in the ES literature. The studies summarized there are for habitats relevant to the Gulf region even though they may have been conducted elsewhere.
 Freshwater Inflows is an ecosystem-based tool that was created to aid in coastal management decisions regarding freshwater inflow, which is an important component of estuarine health.

References

External links 
 Harte Research Institute for Gulf of Mexico Studies
 SGM Summit 2014

Texas A&M University–Corpus Christi
2000 establishments in Texas